The men's 110 metres hurdles event at the 2014 African Championships in Athletics was held August 12–13 on Stade de Marrakech.

Medalists

Results

Heats
Qualification: First 3 of each heat (Q) and the next 2 fastest (q) qualified for the final.

Wind: Heat 1: 0.0 m/s, Heat 2: -0.3 m/s

Final
Wind: +0.5 m/s

References

2014 African Championships in Athletics
Sprint hurdles at the African Championships in Athletics